Wolfram Bode (born March 8, 1942) is a German biochemist.

Biography
Born in Berlin, Bode was educated in chemistry and biochemistry at the University of Göttingen, the University of Tübingen and the University of Munich as a fellow of the Studienstiftung des deutschen Volkes. He obtained his Ph.D. in 1971 at the University of Munich for studies of the bacterial flagellum. Since 1972 he is working at the Max Planck Institute of Biochemistry in Martinsried. Bode is associate professor at the University of Munich.

Career
During his graduate studies Bode was using x-ray scattering. After his Ph.D. he then joined the lab of Robert Huber to work with x-ray crystallography. In 1975 Bode published the structure of trypsin, which was among the first protease structures that could be solved. His following work on the structure and function of proteins has contributed significantly to the understanding of several important biological processes, especially coagulation, fibrinolysis and photosynthesis.

External links
 https://www.researchgate.net/profile/Wolfram_Bode

1942 births
Living people
Scientists from Berlin
German biochemists
Studienstiftung alumni
Academic staff of the Ludwig Maximilian University of Munich
University of Göttingen alumni
University of Tübingen alumni
Ludwig Maximilian University of Munich alumni